Dmitry Nikolayevich Chestnov (also known as Dmitrij Nikolaevič Čestnov) is a Russian astronomer, observer and photometrist of comets and discoverer of minor planets. He lives in Saransk, the capital city of the Republic of Mordovia, Russia.

He is credited by the Minor Planet Center with the discovery of several minor planets during 2009–2010, all in collaboration with Russian astronomer and colleague Artyom Novichonok at Tzec Maun Observatory  in Mayhill, New Mexico.

According to the Comet Observation database (COBS), which is maintained by the Slovenian Črni Vrh Observatory, Dmitry Chestnov has submitted dozens of observations of comets under his user code "CHE09". Several cometary observations, including those of the hyperbolic comet C/2009 O4 (HILL) he took at Tzec Maun's southern station  in Pingelly, Western Australia. He also participated in the recovery of periodic comet 246P/NEAT at the Kislovodsk Mountain Astronomical Station of Pulkovo Observatory  in November 2011. He has published a large number of secular lightcurves of comets on his Comet Light Curve Refinement Program (LiCuRG) website.

List of discovered minor planets

See also

References

External links 
 An interview with Comet ISON's co-discoverer, Artyom Novichonok, college of Dmitry Chestnov
 Comet Light Curve Refinement Program (LiCuRG) by Dmitry Chestnov
 Publications by Dmitry N. Chestnov
 Comet Observers of the world

20th-century Russian astronomers
21st-century Russian astronomers
Discoverers of asteroids
Discoverers of minor planets

Living people
Year of birth missing (living people)